The McEwan's Lager Welsh Classic was a women's professional golf tournament on the Ladies European Tour held in Wales. It was played at Dinas Powys in 1979 and Whitchurch, Cardiff in 1980 and 1981.

Winners

Source:

See also
Women's Welsh Open

References

External links
Ladies European Tour

Former Ladies European Tour events
Golf tournaments in Wales
Defunct sports competitions in Wales
Recurring sporting events established in 1979
Recurring sporting events disestablished in 1981